Monsters Under the Bed is an album by the Canadian hard rock band Honeymoon Suite, released in 1991. The band was now a trio, consisting of Johnnie Dee, Dermot "Derry" Grehan, and returning keyboardist Ray Coburn.

Production
The album was produced by Paul Northfield, Ray Coburn, Johnnie Dee, and Derry Grehan. It was partly recorded in St. Anne-des-Lacs, Quebec. The band's rhythm section consisted of session musicians Steve Webster (bass) and Jorn Anderson (drums). "How Long" is about Niagara Falls. "Bring On the Light" was inspired by the Oka Crisis.

Critical reception

The Calgary Herald noted that there are "lots of Grehan power riffs balanced (thankfully) by washes of Coburn's synthesizers and organ."

Track listing 
All songs written by Ray Coburn, Johnnie Dee, and Derry Grehan.

Personnel 
Honeymoon Suite:
 Johnnie Dee – lead vocals
 Derry Grehan – guitars, vocals
 Ray Coburn – keyboards
with:
 Steve Webster - bass guitar
 Jorn Anderson - drums
 Suki Mars - background vocals on 1 and 11

References

Honeymoon Suite albums
1991 albums